One Exciting Night may refer to:
 One Exciting Night (1922 film), an American Gothic silent mystery film
 One Exciting Night (1944 film), a British musical comedy film